Metropolitan areas in Romania are private agencies of public utility which were established by Law no. 351 of 6 July 2001 with the aim of encouraging the development of neighboring towns and communes within a radius of 30 km. The first to be established was the metropolitan area of Iași, on 8 April 2004, while the last is that of Drobeta-Turnu Severin, on 28 August 2019. There are 24 metropolitan areas in Romania that have been constituted as of 2019.

Legislative status 
The 2001 legislation regulates the status of the 319 cities in Romania according to their population and regional importance (Law no. 351 of 6 July 2001):
 rank 0 – the capital of Romania, municipality of European importance;
 rank I – municipalities of national importance, with potential influence at European level;
 rank II – municipalities of inter-county or county importance or with a balancing role in the network of localities;
 rank III – towns. 
Legislation also restricts the possibility to engage into a metropolitan area project to only those cities that are of rank 0 or I. The metropolitan areas are thus organized as legal entities without legal personality, being able to function on a perimeter independent of the limits of the administrative-territorial units, established by mutual agreement by the local public administration authorities. Legislation was amended in 2011 to allow county seat municipalities to form metropolitan areas in association with urban and rural localities in their immediate vicinity (i.e., up to 30 km from the main city).

Constituted metropolitan areas

Planned metropolitan areas

Conurbations 

 Baia Mare–Satu Mare (estimated population: 400,000)
 Bucharest–Ploiești–Târgoviște (estimated population: 3 million)
 Lower Danube (Galați–Brăila) (estimated population: 580,000)
 Prahova Valley (Câmpina–Predeal) |(estimated population: 150,000)
 Suceava–Botoșani (estimated population: 300,000)
 Timișoara–Arad (estimated population: 805,000)

Functional urban areas 
In the EU, as defined by Eurostat, a functional urban area (FUA) – formerly known as larger urban zone (LUZ) – consists of a city and its commuting zone.

See also 

 List of cities in Romania
Lower Danube metropolitan area

References 

 
Romania
Romania geography-related lists